This is a compilation of the results of teams representing England at the official international competitions for European women's football clubs, that is, the former UEFA Women's Cup and its successor the UEFA Women's Champions League.

England is one of four associations that have won the competition along with Germany, France, and Sweden, and as of the 2016–17 edition it stands fourth with a coefficient of 58,000 in the UWCL association rankings, which gives it two spots.

Teams 
These are the eight teams that have represented England in the UEFA Women's Cup and the UEFA Women's Champions League.

Qualification

Progression by season 

1 Group stage. Highest-ranked eliminated team in case of qualification, lowest-ranked qualified team in case of elimination.

Results by team

Arsenal

Birmingham City

Bristol City

Chelsea

Everton

Fulham

Liverpool

Manchester City

References 

Women's football clubs in international competitions
+Women